Sonic Diary is a two-disc compilation release from Apoptygma Berzerk. The first disc contains a collection of covers the band has recorded over the course of their career while the second disc is a collection of remixes, some of which were previously released and others which were new.

Apoptygma Berzerk also released their Black EP in 2006; the ten-song Black EP contains several remixes of songs from You and Me Against the World.

Track listing

Charts

References

Apoptygma Berzerk albums
2006 compilation albums
GUN Records compilation albums